Dennis Claude (ca. 1782 – 1863) was a 2-time mayor of Annapolis, Maryland (1828–1837, 1853–1854). He was the father of 4-time mayor of Annapolis Abram Claude.

External links

Dennis Claude, MSA SC 3520-1540 – Maryland State Archives
msa.maryland.gov/msa/speccol/sc3500/sc3520/.../msa01540.html

Mayors of Annapolis, Maryland
1782 births
1863 deaths
19th-century American politicians